Millville is a community in the Canadian province of Nova Scotia, located in  Victoria County.

Communities in Victoria County, Nova Scotia